Roti Kapada Aur Makaan (occasionally written as Roti Kapda Aur Makaan) is a 1974 Indian Hindi-language action drama film written, directed, and produced by Manoj Kumar. The title of the movie is based on the Hindi phrase, which refers to the bare necessities of life, popularized in the late 1960s by former Prime Minister Indira Gandhi, ahead of the 1967 general elections.

The film is about a family for which Bharat (Manoj Kumar) attempts to provide for after falling into a financial struggle. The film also stars Amitabh Bachchan as Vijay, the brother of Bharat, and stars Zeenat Aman as Sheetal, Bharat's love interest, Moushumi Chatterjee as Tulsi, a friend of Bharat in poverty, and Shashi Kapoor as Mohan Babu, a wealthy businessman. It has been remade into the Telugu film Jeevana Poratam, and today is still considered to be highly influential, and one of the best Bollywood films of its era.

Plot
After the retirement of his dad (Krishan Dhawan), the responsibility is on Bharat (Manoj Kumar) to look after his Delhi-based family. He has two younger college-going brothers, Vijay (Amitabh Bachchan) and Deepak (Dheeraj Kumar) and a sister of marriageable age, Champa (Meena T.). Although Bharat is a college graduate, the only work he can find is as a low-paid singer, much to the frustration of his girlfriend, Sheetal (Zeenat Aman). Meanwhile, Vijay has turned to crime as a last resort to provide for the family, but after an argument with Bharat, he leaves home to join the army.

Sheetal starts working as a secretary for rich businessman Mohan Babu (Shashi Kapoor) and Mohan becomes attracted to her. She becomes attracted to Mohan but is more interested in his wealth and luxury. She loves Bharat but cannot contemplate a life in poverty. Bharat finally finds a job as a builder but starts to realise that Sheetal is slowly drifting away from him. Soon he loses his job after the government takes over the building site and his financial problems increase further. When Mohan proposes marriage to Sheetal, she accepts, leaving Bharat heartbroken. After losing his love, Bharat also loses his father, which devastates him. Frustrated, he burns his diploma on his father's funeral pyre.

Meanwhile, Champa has found a suitor, but Bharat has no money to pay for the wedding and it cannot go ahead. Depressed at the state of his life, Bharat soon finds salvation by helping a poor girl, Tulsi (Moushumi Chatterjee), who lives in poverty but gets by. He also makes friends with Sardar Harnam Singh (Prem Nath) who comes to his rescue when he attempts to save Tulsi from a gang of hoodlums. He then receives an offer from a corrupt businessman named Nekiram (Madan Puri) who persuades Bharat to do his illegal activities so he and his family will come out of poverty and be wealthy, for which he accepts.

Deepak joins the Police force. Bharat, who is working for Nekiram, decides to inform the police about his malpractices. Nekiram finds out and frames Bharat and Deepak instead. Deepak is the police officer appointed for arresting Bharat.

Bharat and Vijay join forces to stop Nekiram. During this conflict Sheetal, who has already realized her mistake, sacrifices her life.

Bharat, Vijay, Deepak, Mohan Babu and Sardar Harnam Singh have Nekiram and his troops jailed in the end. Bharat sees Sheetal in Tulsi and accepts her.

Cast
Manoj Kumar as Bharat
Shashi Kapoor as Mohan Babu
Amitabh Bachchan as Vijay
Zeenat Aman as Sheetal
Moushmi Chatterjee as Tulsi
Prem Nath as Harnam Singh
Dheeraj Kumar as Deepak
Kamini Kaushal as Bharat's mother
Aruna Irani as Poonam
Madan Puri as Nekiram
Krishan Dhawan as Bharat's father
Meena T as Champa
Sulochana as Mohan's mother
Raza Murad as Hamid Miya
Raj Mehra
Manmohan
C S Dubey
Darshan Lal

Soundtrack
The music was composed by the duo Laxmikant–Pyarelal and Lyrics	by Santosh Anand. Lyrics of Mehngai Maar Gayi, Hay Hay ye Majboori and Pandit ji mere marne ke baad were written by Verma Malik.

Reception 
This film was a major commercial success, emerging as the highest grossing Indian film of 1974, and was declared a blockbuster. The film received three Filmfare awards, as well as being nominated for eleven others.

Awards and nominations

References

External links 

1974 films
1970s Hindi-language films
Films scored by Laxmikant–Pyarelal
Social realism in film
Films set in Delhi
Hindi films remade in other languages
Films directed by Manoj Kumar
Filmfare Awards winners